Richard Taylor (born 14 July 1973) is a former Australian rules footballer who played with Hawthorn and West Coast in the AFL.

Taylor was a rover and made his debut for Hawthorn in a game again Essendon in 1992, contributing 3 goals in a 160-point win. After suffering a knee injury in 1993 he was delisted but was picked up again in the pre-season draft. He finished second in Hawthorn's 1999 Best and Fairest awards.

External links

Profile at Hawksheadquarters

1973 births
Living people
Australian rules footballers from Victoria (Australia)
Hawthorn Football Club players
West Coast Eagles players
People educated at Camberwell Grammar School
Swan Districts Football Club players
East Perth Football Club players